Novopetrovsky is a rural locality (a khutor) in Bolshevistskoye Rural Settlement, Yelansky District, Volgograd Oblast, Russia. The population was 139 as of 2010.

Geography 
Novopetrovsky is located on Khopyorsko-Buzulukskaya Plain, 52 km southeast of Yelan (the district's administrative centre) by road. Zelyony is the nearest rural locality.

References 

Rural localities in Yelansky District